Etta James is the self-titled third studio album by American blues artist, Etta James. The album was released on Argo Records in 1962 and was produced by Ralph Bass.

Background 
The album was released on a 12-inch LP and consisted of ten tracks, with five of them on each side of the vinyl record. The album spawned the single, "Something's Got a Hold on Me" b/w "Waiting for Charlie to Come Home", which was written for James by Burt Bacharach, reached the Top 40 in 1962. The album also included two duets with Harvey Fuqua, "If I Can't Have You" and "Spoonful" which were previously released as singles by James and Fugua on the Chess label.

Track listing 
Side one

Side two

Personnel 
 Etta James - lead vocals
 The Riley Hampton Orchestra
 Riley Hampton - arranger, conductor
 Harvey Fuqua - duet vocals on "If I Can't Have You" and "Spoonful"

Technical
 Ron Malo - engineer
 James J. Kriegsmann - photography

Charts 
Singles - Billboard (United States)

References

1962 albums
Etta James albums
Argo Records albums
Albums produced by Leonard Chess
Albums produced by Phil Chess